David Kevin Giler (July 23, 1943 – December 19, 2020) was an American filmmaker who was active in the film industry since the early 1960s.

Career

Television
Giler's father Bernie (1908–1967) was a writer. Giler began his career collaborating with his father for television programs such as The Gallant Men ("Signals for an End Run") (1962), Kraft Suspense Theatre ("Leviathan Five") (1964), Burke's Law ("Who Killed the Man on the White Horse?") (1965), and The Girl from U.N.C.L.E. ("The Low Blue C Affair") (1967).

Giler's father died in 1967 and he began to be credited on his own on such shows as The Man from U.N.C.L.E. ("The Matterhorn Affair") (1967), and The Bold Ones: The Lawyers ("The Crowd Pleaser") (1969).

Features
Giler had begun writing feature films. In 1968 he was reportedly writing a script called Our Bag.

His first produced credit was the critically reviled Myra Breckinridge, an adaptation of Gore Vidal's controversial novel. The resulting movie was a disaster but Giler's script – heavily rewritten by director Michael Sarne – was much praised. He wrote a remake of The Postman Always Rings Twice and adapted The King Must Die but neither was made. He did some uncredited rewriting on Skin Game (1971).

He was credited on The Parallax View (1974). In 1975 Giler turned to directing, his only film in that capacity, The Black Bird.

Giler wrote Fun with Dick and Jane (1977), and an adaptation of Fear of Flying that was never filmed.

Walter Hill
Giler formed the production company Brandywine Productions with Walter Hill and Gordon Carroll and in 1979 the trio co-produced and rewrote the script for the legendary horror thriller, Alien. He and Hill became embroiled in a much-publicized behind-the-scenes fight with Alien original writer, Dan O'Bannon, over who was to receive screenplay credit. Giler and Hill claim they completely rewrote the script  and therefore wanted to relegate O'Bannon to a 'story by' credit only. O'Bannon claimed  they did little more than change the names of the characters and dialogue. Ultimately, O'Bannon was the only one to receive credit for the screenplay in the final film, alongside a 'story by' co-credit with Ronald Shusett.

Giler and Hill later wrote Southern Comfort, and wrote the storyline, alongside James Cameron, that became the basis for Cameron's 1986 sequel, Aliens.

Giler on his own wrote the comedy The Money Pit (1986). He did an uncredited rewrite on Beverly Hills Cop II (1987) and produced Rustlers' Rhapsody (1985). He wrote a remake of The Decline of the American Empire which was not filmed.

Hill and Giler executive produced Tales from the Crypt and Tales from the Cryptkeeper for cable channel HBO. They returned to the Alien franchise, producing (and co-writing with Larry Ferguson) Alien 3 (1992). They were credited as producers on Alien Resurrection (1997) but had minimal involvement with it; the same applies for the other sequels.

Giler and Hill wrote and produced Undisputed.

Personal life
Giler was married to actress Nancy Kwan from 1970 until their divorce in 1972.

On December 19, 2020, he died of cancer at his home in Bangkok.

Filmography

Films

Television

References

External links
 

1943 births
2020 deaths
American filmmakers
Hugo Award-winning writers
Deaths from cancer in Thailand